The NMF Properties Derry Senior Football Championship 2009 is the 2009 installment of the annual Derry Senior Football Championship run by the Derry GAA. Ballinderry are the current holders - beating Slaughtneil in the 2008 final at Celtic Park. The winners were awarded the John McLaughlin Cup and went on to represent Derry in the 2009 Ulster Senior Club Football Championship.

Match schedule
Round 1 - Friday 1 May to Monday 4 May
Round 2 - 
Round 3 - 
Quarter-finals - 
Semi-finals - 
Final -

Round 1
The draw for the first round took place on 3 March 2009 at the Owenbeg Centre of Excellence (outside Dungiven), along with the draws for the other Derry adult football and hurling championships. The 2009 Championship started on 1 May with the meeting of Ballinascreen and Castledawson at Shamrock Park, Ballinderry. Six games were played on 3 May, with double-headers at Foreglen, Ballymaguigan (originally scheduled for Magherafelt) and Glenullin. The last first round tie was played in Páirc Seán de Brún, Bellaghy on Monday 4 May. There were two shocks results in the first round, with Lavey defeating reigning Championships Ballinderry and Swatragh beating local rivals and 2008 runners-up Slaughtneil.

Round 2
The draw for the second round took place on 5 May 2009.

Round 3
The draw for the third round took place after the last Round 2 game (Ballinderry versus Banagher).

Quarter-finals
The four teams who won both their first and second round matches were drawn against the four winners from the Round 3 "qualifiers".
 
The draw for the quarter-finals was originally supposed to occur after the last third round game (Ballinascreen versus Ballinderry) at Bellaghy. However the draw could not take place because of Lavey's draw with Eoghan Rua. Teams who have already met earlier in the championship could not be paired with each other again in the quarter-finals - the number of such permutations meant the draw was delayed until after the Lavey versus Eoghan Rua replay at Glenullin.

The Round 3 replay and delayed draw also led to the quarter-finals being postponed for a week. They were originally intended to be played a week after the third round, but the delayed draw meant teams would not know their opponents until Wednesday 12 August, which did not give them sufficient notice to play that weekend.

The Ballinderry versus Glenullin match was billed beforehand as tie of the round, and the game everyone wanted to see in the final. It did not disappoint. It was described as "one of the best games seen in this county for years". An Lúb beat Newbridge in a "dogged" encounter, while Bellaghy survived a late Magherafelt comeback to secure their place in the semis. The Dungiven and Eoghan Rua game was supposed to take place on 23 August at 2.00pm at Foreglen. However, before throw-in the game was postponed due to a water-logged pitch. It was rescheduled for two days later in Celtic Park. Dungiven won the game by six points.

Semi-finals
The semi-final draw took place at Celtic Park after the quarter-final tie between Ballinderry and Glenullin. It pitted Glenullin against the winners of Dungiven and Eoghan Rua (which turned out to be Dungiven) and Bellaghy against An Lúb. The game are scheduled to take place on 12/13 September.

Final

See also
Derry Senior Hurling Championship

References

External links
Official Derry website
Derry on Hoganstand
Derry Club GAA

Gaelic
Derry Senior Football Championship
Derry Senior Football Championship